Ulla Saar (born 4 January 1975 in Tallinn) is an Estonian illustrator, product designer, graphic artist, and interior designer.

She has graduated from Estonian Academy of Arts in product design.

Her illustrations for the children's book Lift received international attention and she was listed in 2014 White Ravens catalogue.

References

Living people
1975 births
21st-century Estonian women artists
Estonian women illustrators
Estonian children's book illustrators
Estonian designers
Interior designers
Tallinn University of Technology alumni
Artists from Tallinn